Beauregard Aurelius "Bo" Brady is a fictional character from the NBC daytime soap opera Days of Our Lives. The role has been most notably portrayed by Peter Reckell, who originated the role on May 3, 1983.

Creation and Casting 
Created under head-writer Margaret DePriest, the role was originated by Peter Reckell on May 3, 1983.  Rebellious blue-collar Bo was paired with more upper-class Hope Williams (Kristian Alfonso), forming one of the show's first and most popular supercouples. Reckell left the show alongside Alfonso on April 20, 1987. Reckell returned from April 19, 1990, to January 17, 1992, until Robert Kelker-Kelly stepped into the role from  March 13, 1992, to July 24, 1995. Reckell returned to portray Bo on August 1, 1995.

In June 2012, after much speculation, it was confirmed that Reckell would once again exit the soap. Reckell filmed his final scenes for Days of our Lives on July 24, 2012, last airing on October 30. On March 18, 2015, it was announced that Reckell had signed a deal to return for the show's fiftieth anniversary, airing on August 28, 2015. In May 2016, it was announced that Reckell would return for a special episode centered around Hope, airing on June 7 and 8, 2016.

Storylines 
Bo was born on November 5, 1963 and is the only son of Caroline Brady (Peggy McCay) and Victor Kiriakis (John Aniston). However, Bo is raised as the youngest child of Caroline and her husband Shawn Brady (Frank Parker) until his paternity reveal in 1985. Bo returned to Salem in 1983 and married Hope Williams (Kristian Alfonso) shortly after. The couple later welcomed their son, Shawn-Douglas Brady. Bo later became a detective at the Salem Police Department. In 2000, Bo and Hope welcomed another son, Zack. During the Salem Stalker storyline, Bo lost his mother and older brother Roman (Josh Taylor). He rejoined the police force to help solve the case and was forced to arrest his former sister-in-law, Dr. Marlena Evans (Deidre Hall). All the victims were discovered on a mysterious island and Bo was on the rescue team. He was also reunited with his ex-wife, Billie Reed (Julie Pinson). On New Year's Day in 2006, Zack was hit by a car driven by Bo and Billie's daughter, Chelsea (Rachel Melvin). To protect Chelsea, Bo hid the truth believing it would destroy his family. In 2008, Chelsea saved Bo's life by donating part of her pancreas when his began failing. Bo suffered a concussion and temporarily experienced psychic visions. In 2012, Bo quit the force after budget cuts and accompanied Caroline to California for Alzheimer's treatment. Caroline eventually returns, but Bo decided to go sailing as it was a lifelong dream of his. Hope and their daughter went sailing with him for a brief vacation however all the boat scenes only include Hope and Ciara in the cabin by themselves.

In late 2013-early 2014, Hope revealed that Bo went to Europe to continue investigating the DiMeras on his own.  However, as time went on and his investigation took on a wider scope (ostensibly as part of a larger ISA mission), so did his absence from home, and Hope.

In March 2014, John Black delivered a message to Hope that Bo's investigation had branched off into a larger, more powerful, and more dangerous criminal organization than even the DiMeras, and is working deep undercover in Europe to bring them down, and may not be back for another year or more. Bo's situation even precluded him from contacting friends and family, and a letter to Hope was the last known contact any Salemite had with him.

Beginning September 2015, Bo was seen being held captive and tortured in a dirty prison, later revealed to be in Mexico.  When Steve, with John's help, began to track him down, he was moved to an equally filthy hospital-looking facility.  Steve, John, and Victor uncover that Bo was working with Victor to help Dr. Salinas find a cure for Caroline's Alzheimer's-type condition. This may have also been at the same time that he was involved in an investigation that may or may not have involved the ISA which had taken him to northern Europe. He was then lured by a Britta Englund-lookalike to Mexico. In November 2015, Bo started to blackout and experienced headaches.  Thanks to his sister, Kayla, he underwent testing and was diagnosed with an inoperable terminal brain tumor. In the location of their first kiss, Bo tells Hope of his condition. Bo and Hope passionately repeat their wedding vows to each other as Bo becomes extremely pale and weak. Hope told Bo that his nephew Will was murdered last month, at which he was devastated. Then Bo lost consciousness and died in Hope's arms, while snow started to fall on them.

In 2022, it is revealed that Bo had been resurrected by Megan Hathaway.

References

External links 
 http://www.soapcentral.com/days
 Bo at soapcentral.com

Days of Our Lives characters
Fictional American police officers
Fictional police commissioners
Fictional Greek people in television
Television characters introduced in 1983
Male characters in television
Fictional characters incorrectly presumed dead
Brady family (Days of Our Lives)
Kiriakis family